The president of the Lao People's Democratic Republic is the head of state of Laos. The current president is Thongloun Sisoulith, since 22 March 2021. He was previously elected as the General Secretary of the Lao People's Revolutionary Party, Laos' most powerful position in January 2021, ranking him first in the Politburo.

History

Background
The office of the President of the People's Democratic Republic traces its lineage back to Prince Souphanouvong, the first President of the People's Democratic Republic, a member of the deposed royal family and one of the Three Princes, who became President when the former Kingdom of Laos was overthrow by the Pathet Lao in 1975, at the end of the Laotian Civil War.

Duties and rights

Term limits
The president is elected by the National Assembly for a term of five years, with no term limits. A candidate must receive at least two-thirds support from lawmakers present and voting in order to be elected.

Role and authority
The president represents Laos internally and externally, supervises the work as well as preserving the stability of the national governmental system and safeguards the independence and territorial integrity of the country. The President appoints the prime minister, vice president, ministers and other officials with the consent of the National Assembly. 

However, Laos is a one party Marxism–Leninism communist state. The highest and the most powerful political position is General Secretary of the Lao People's Revolutionary Party, not the President. The general secretary controls the Politburo and the Secretariat, Laos' top decision-making bodies, making the officeholder as de facto leader of Laos.

Additionally, the President is the commander-in-chief of the Lao People's Armed Forces. Since Laos is a one-party state, with the Lao People's Revolutionary Party as the only legally permitted party, all the presidents of the People's Democratic Republic have been members of the party while holding office.

List of presidents

See also
 List of monarchs of Laos
 Vice President of Laos
 Prime Minister of Laos

References

Specific

Bibliography
Books:
 
 
 
 
 

Journal articles:
 
 
 
 
 
 

Report:
 

Laos
Laos politics-related lists
 
1975 establishments in Laos